is Jinn's first major album. It was released on February 28, 2007.

Track listing

"26 other side"

"√135"

 "Someday"

Jinn (band) albums
2006 albums